Roger Cardinal may refer to:

 Roger Cardinal (art historian) (1940–2019), British art historian
 Roger Cardinal (director) (1940–2017), Canadian film director